Galopprennbahn Hamburg-Horn (Hamburg-Horn Racecourse), also known as Horner Rennbahn, is a major horse racing venue located in Horn, Hamburg, Germany. It is Germany's oldest horse-racing track, built in 1855. It has a capacity of 50,000 spectators.

The nearest public transit station is Horner Rennbahn station of Hamburg U-Bahn.

See also  

 List of German flat horse races
 List of horse racing venues by capacity

References

External links

 www.galopp-hamburg.de 
 Venue information on worldstadiums.com

Horse racing venues in Germany
Sports venues in Hamburg
Buildings and structures in Hamburg-Mitte
1869 establishments in Germany